Duckmaloi River, a perennial stream that is part of the Macquarie catchment within the Murray–Darling basin, is located in the Central Tablelands region of New South Wales, Australia.

The Duckmaloi River rises on the western slopes of the Great Dividing Range east of Shooters Hill, and flows generally to the north and then east, where it forms its confluence with the Fish River near Oberon; dropping  over the course of its  length.

A small weir on the river, called the Duckmaloi Weir, forms part of the Fish River Water Supply Scheme and was constructed during 1963. The Scheme supplies water to Oberon and Lithgow Councils and the Sydney Catchment Authority for town water supplies, as well as Wallerawang and Mount Piper power stations owned by Delta Electricity for power generation purposes. The waters surrounding the weir are a site for a large platypus colony.

See also 
 Rivers of New South Wales
List of rivers of Australia

References 

Rivers of New South Wales
Murray-Darling basin
Central Tablelands